The discography of Welsh alternative rock band the Joy Formidable consists of three studio albums, one live album, three extended plays and 15 singles. Their debut extended play, A Balloon Called Moaning, was released in December 2008, followed by their debut studio album, The Big Roar, in January 2011, which reached No. 31 on the UK Albums Chart, and produced the singles "Whirring" and "A Heavy Abacus", which reached No. 7 and No. 25 on the US Alternative Songs Chart, respectively. Their second studio album, Wolf's Law, was released in January 2013 and reached No. 41 and No. 51 on the UK Albums Chart and the US Billboard 200, respectively. Their third studio album, Hitch was released in March 2016. Their fourth studio album, AAARTH, was released on 28 September 2018. Their fifth studio album, Into the Blue, was released on 20 August 2021.

Albums

Studio albums

Notes

Live albums

Extended plays

Singles

Promotional singles

Notes:
  - These tracks were re-released in 2011 in promotion of The Big Roar.
  - This track was included only on the Japanese and limited editions of The Big Roar
  - These tracks were released as part of the Aruthrol singles collection, in which The Joy Formidable released a single, usually in Welsh, along with another Welsh band.

References 

Joy Formidable
Joy Formidable